Kadoli may refer to the following places in India :

 Kadoli, Karnataka, a village
 Kadoli State, a former princely state in Saber Kantha thana, Mahi Kantha, Gujarat
 Kadoli, Maharashtra, a small town in the Hingoli district of Maharashtra

See also

Karoli (name)